No Men Beyond This Point is a 2015 Canadian comedy film directed by Mark Sawers. It was shown in the Vanguard section of the 2015 Toronto International Film Festival and acquired for distribution by Samuel Goldwyn Films (worldwide rights excluding Canada).

Plot
The film is a science fiction mockumentary set in an alternate timeline several decades after a near-Earth object almost hit Earth in 1952, making it possible for women to reproduce by parthenogenesis without men. Men are no longer born, and they have disappeared from all important positions. The male sex has become a dying breed. The remaining men are kept on a reserve and are no longer part of society, with the exception of a few men who are allowed to do menial  work. In this world women are wearing the pants, are legally required to be asexual, and have no male offspring anymore. It is now up to the quiet and modest household helper Andrew Myers to ensure that the male gender does not go extinct. The 37-year-old is the youngest living man on Earth and works for a family made up entirely of women.

Cast

 Patrick Gilmore as Andrew Myers
 Kristine Cofsky as Iris Balashev
 Tara Pratt as Terra Granger
 Cameron McDonald as Darius Smith
 Morgan Taylor Campbell as Dahlia Granger
 Rekha Sharma as Ajala Bhatt
 Mary Black as Helen Duvall
 Ken Kramer as Gordon Trescott

Accolades
At the 2015 Vancouver International Film Festival, the BC Spotlight jury offered an honourable mention to No Men Beyond This Point in the Best BC Film category. At the 2015 Other Worlds Austin SciFi Film Festival, No Men Beyond This Point won the Best Feature Audience Award and also won “Cthulhies” for Feature Script, Feature Actor, and Feature Editing.

References

External links
 

2015 films
2015 comedy films
2010s science fiction comedy films
Canadian science fiction comedy films
Canadian satirical films
Canadian mockumentary films
English-language Canadian films
Films directed by Mark Sawers
2010s English-language films
2010s Canadian films